Martín Alejandro Lema Perretta (born September 6, 1982) is a Uruguayan lawyer and politician of the National Party, serving as Minister of Social Development since May 3, 2021. 

Lema was born in Jacinto Vera, Montevideo and attended Elbio Fernández School. Graduated from the University of the Republic, he served as Representative between 2015 and 2020.  And from February 15, 2020, he served President of the Chamber of Representatives.

Political career 
He began his political career in 2006 with the current President of the Republic, Luis Lacalle Pou. Two years later, on September 11, 2008, and accompanied by other young people, they founded the Montevideo 404 list.  In the October 2014 election, he was elected National Representative for Montevideo by List 404, effectively assuming his seat in February 2015. During the period, he focused on issues related to health and social policies. He was a member of the Health and Social Assistance Commission of the House of Representatives, for which he was appointed president during the second term of the legislature (2017). In the same year, the legislator encouraged the installation of the first cardiac IMAE in the north of the country.

Among initiatives and requests for a report, in 2017 he promoted and promoted the creation of the investigative Commission "Management of ASSE since 2008 and the scam of FONASA", whose work finally determined the removal of the ASSE leadership from the then President of the Republic, Tabaré Vázquez, on February 14, 2018.

President of the Chamber of Representatives 
In the first session of the 49th Legislature of the Chamber of Representatives, he was elected President of the House, being voted by 98 votes of 99 deputies present. In his investiture speech, he announced that his measures will focus on a "strengthening of control" of parliamentary activity.

Minister of Social Development 
On May 1, 2021, President Lacalle Pou announced that Lema would succeed Pablo Bartol as the head Minister of Social Development. Bartol had been fired because "health, labor, social and educational consequences of the pandemic will demand a strong political and territorial articulation mark" and he had no political party ties until his approach to Lacalle Pou's campaign. Lema tweeted: "We will assume with great commitment and we will work hard to rise to the challenges." He also stated that Bartol's management had served as an "inspiration."

References

External links 

 Martín Lema's virtual office

1982 births
Living people
People from Montevideo
National Party (Uruguay) politicians
Presidents of the Chamber of Representatives of Uruguay
21st-century Uruguayan lawyers
Members of the Chamber of Representatives of Uruguay

Ministers of Social Development of Uruguay